Rodgers Omunsulah Nandwa (born 3 October 1981 in Kenya) is a Kenyan turned Vietnamese footballer who last played.

Becoming Vietnamese in 2011, he changed his name from Rodgers Omunsulah Nandwa to Nguyen Van Rodgers to suit his new nationality and was endowed the rights of citizenship.

Early life and childhood

 
Growing up on a farm in Kenya, he played street football with his friends as a recreational activity.

Next, he milked livestock for a living and was sometimes allotted less than 300 dollars a month. A dealer observed his physical vigor in a local match and offered him an opportunity to 
play his trade abroad in Vietnam. Immediately, he validly accepted the offer.

Career
The Kenyan had a short stint in Uganda before heading to Vietnam which may be why he is labelled by some sources as Ugandan.

At first, Nguyen Rodgers pondered whether to leave Vietnam as he lacked rudimentary football skills, tactical knowledge and people were not impressed with his expertise. Then coach Tran Van Phuc persuaded him to stay and helped him develop his overall skills in football; he hit eight goals in his first season with Thanh Hoa. In the end he left Thanh Hoa the reason being knee cartilage issues.
Transferred to Dong Nai F.C. in 2013.
For a short amount of time he migrated to different areas in Vietnam as he was deprived of a job.

Netted his first goal for Can Tho on August 9 which was the 400th goal in the 2015 V.League 1; he also participated in all 21 rounds of the 2015 V.League 1.

Former outfit Thanh Hoa are planning to buy the player.

References

Naturalized citizens of Vietnam
Expatriate footballers in Vietnam
Living people
V.League 1 players
People from Kitale
Vietnamese people of Kenyan descent
Association football midfielders
Kenyan footballers
1981 births
Becamex Binh Duong FC players